Tomás de Heres Airport is an airport serving Ciudad Bolívar, the capital of the Bolívar state of Venezuela.

The airport is named in honor of Tomás de Heres, a hero of Latin American independence and governor of Venezuela's former Guayana Province.

The airport serves as a maintenance base for RUTACA Airlines.

The Ciudad Bolivar VOR-DME (Ident: CBL) is located on the field.

Airlines and destinations

Accidents and incidents
 On 25 January 2001, RUTACA Airlines Flight 225, operated by Douglas DC-3C YV-224-C crashed at Ciudad Bolívar killing all 24 on board plus one person on the ground. Another person on the ground was seriously injured. There were unconfirmed reports that a 25th person may have been on board the aircraft. The aircraft was on a non-scheduled domestic passenger flight from Tomás de Heres Airport to Del Caribe "Santiago Mariño" International Airport, Porlamar and had developed an engine problem shortly after take-off.

See also
 Transport in Venezuela
 List of airports in Venezuela

References

External links
 OurAirports - Tomás de Heres
 SkyVector - Tomás de Heres
 OpenStreetMap - Ciudad Bolivar
 

Airports in Venezuela
Buildings and structures in Bolívar (state)